Benson Sakala (born 12 September 1996) is a Zambian footballer who plays as a midfielder for Power Dynamos F.C. and the Zambia national football team.

References

External links

1996 births
Living people
Red Arrows F.C. players
Power Dynamos F.C. players
Zambian footballers
Zambia international footballers
Association football midfielders
Sportspeople from Lusaka
Zambia youth international footballers
Zambia Super League players
Zambia A' international footballers
2016 African Nations Championship players
2020 African Nations Championship players